Pseudotropheus fuscus is a species of cichlid endemic to Lake Malawi where it is known from Nkhata Bay and Lion's Cove. It feeds on algae. This species can reach a length of  TL. It can also be found in the aquarium trade.

References

fuscus
Fish described in 1935
Taxonomy articles created by Polbot